The South Central Asian Gymnastics Championships is an artistic gymnastics competition held for gymnasts from Central and South Asian countries. It is governed by the Asian Gymnastics Union.

Participating nations

 
 Bangladesh

 Islamic Republic of Pakistan

Summary of championships

References

Gymnastics competitions
Gymnastics